Antoonops is a genus of spiders in the family Oonopidae. It was first described in 2008 by Fannes & Jocqué. , it contains 6 species.

Species
Antoonops comprises the following species:
Antoonops bouaflensis Fannes & Jocqué, 2008 - Ivory Coast
Antoonops corbulo Fannes & Jocqué, 2008 - Ivory Coast, Ghana
Antoonops iita Fannes & Jocqué, 2008 - Nigeria
Antoonops kamieli Fannes, 2013 - Ivory Coast
Antoonops nebula Fannes & Jocqué, 2008 - Ghana
Antoonops sarae Fannes, 2013 - Cameroon

References

Oonopidae
Araneomorphae genera
Spiders of Africa